The men's 4 × 10 kilometre relay cross-country skiing event was part of the cross-country skiing at the 1948 Winter Olympics programme. It was the second appearance of the event. The competition was held on Tuesday, 3 February 1948. Forty-four cross-country skiers from eleven nations competed.

Medalists

Results

References

External links
Official Olympic Report
 

Men's 4 x 10 kilometre relay
Men's 4 × 10 kilometre relay cross-country skiing at the Winter Olympics